The Sturgeon volcanic field is a lava field in Queensland, Australia. The volcanic fields are the remnants of a series of volcanic eruptions, the youngest of which is dated to the Pleistocene era. The fields cover an estimated 7500 square kilometers.

References 

Volcanoes of Queensland